Simon Schwartzman (born July 1939 in Belo Horizonte, Brazil) is a Brazilian social scientist. He has published extensively, with many books, book chapters and academic articles in the areas of comparative politics, sociology of science, social policy, and education, with emphasis on Brazil and Latin America. He was the President of the Brazilian Institute for Geography and Statistics (IBGE) and is a retired professor from the Federal University of Minas Gerais. He is member of the Brazilian Academy of Sciences,   holder of the Grand Cross of the Brazilian Order of Scientific Merit (1996).  He is currently associate researcher at the Institute for Studies in Economic Policy  Instituto de Estudos de Política Econômica / Casa das Garças - Rio de Janeiro.

Education 

Schwartzman received his BA in Sociology, Political Science and Public Administration from the Federal University of Minas Gerais. He received an MA in sociology from the Facultad Latinoamericana de Ciencias Sociales (FLACSO) in Santiago, Chile. He achieved his Ph.D. in political science at the  University of California, Berkeley.

Biography 

He was born in Belo Horizonte, Brazil, son of Jewish parents who migrated to Brazil from Poland and Bessarabia in the 1920s. He studied sociology, political science, and public administration the School of Economics of the Federal University of Minas Gerais, Brazil (1958-61), and worked for his master’s degree at the Latin American School of Social Sciences (FLACSO) in Santiago, Chile (1962-3). In early 1964 he returned at the University of Minas Gerais as a faculty member, but, after the military coup of 1964, he was arrested, prosecuted on political grounds, and the University was ordered not to allow him to return to work. 

In late 1965 he left Brazil to work as a fellow of the International Peace Research Institute in Oslo, Norway, invited by Johan Galtung.  In 1966 he went to work at the Fundación Bariloche in Argentina, and in 1967-8 he studied political science at the University of California, Berkeley. 

He returned to Brazil in 1969, settled in Rio de Janeiro, where he worked at the Getúlio Vargas Foundation (EBAP) and at the University Research Institute, Candido Mendes University. Between 1976 and 1979 he worked at the Brazilian Financing Agency for Studies and Projects (FINEP), and, between 1989 and 1994, at the University of São Paulo, as professor of political science and academic coordinator of the Research Group on Higher Education (NUPES). He was the President of the Brazilian Institute for Geography and Statistics (IBGE) between 1994 and 1998. After leaving IBGE, he joined the American Institutes for Research AIR) as its director for Brazil, and later the Institute for Studies on Labor and Society (IETS).  

His memoir was published in 2021 as Falso mineiro: memórias da política, ciência, educação e Sociedade

Affiliations 

He is a member of the Brazilian Academy of Sciences and aHe was a professor of sociology and political science at the Instituto Universitário de Pesquisas do Rio de Janeiro, the University of São Paulo and the Universidade Federal de Minas Gerais. Between 1994 and 1998 he was president of the Brazilian Institute of Geography and Statistics (IBGE)

Schwartzman is or was also a member of the advisory boards of several institutions, including the Brazilian Institute of Geography and Statistics and The Edelstein Center for Social Research and of several journals, including Annals of the Brazilian Academy of Sciences; [Dados - Revista de Ciências Sociais]; Education Policy Analysis Archives; Science, Technology and Human Values; Nova Economia and Teoria e Sociedad.

Academic Contributions 
Political Science and social policy

His doctoral dissertation, Regional cleavages and political patrimonialism in Brazil, dealt with the issues of social development and authoritarianism in Brazil in a comparative perspective, looking at the historical roots and current implications of political patrimonialism and authoritarianism. The work was published in Brazil in several editions as São Paulo e o Estado Nacional and later as Bases do Autoritarismo Brasileiro (Foundations of Authoritarianism in Brazil). The book is considered a reference in the literature on the characteristics of Brazil’s political system. In 2004 he published a book on Poverty, social exclusion and modernity, and in 2011 he coedited a book on The New Social Agenda” for Brazil and was engaged in a comparative study on development and democracy in India, South Africa and Brazil.

Science, Technology and Society

In 1970s he joined the research group of the Brazilian Financing Agency for Studies and Projects (FINEP), where he coordinated a major study on the origins and development of the Brazilian scientific community. The book was published in English as A Space for Science – The Development of the Scientific Community in Brazil  and had three Brazilian editions   The book became a main reference for research on the history of science and society in Brazil and Latin America. In 1984 he was one of the co-authors of  The New Production of Knowledge  a book which created a major debate by arguing that contemporary science and technology was shifting towards a different institutional arrangement called “mode 2”. In 1993-4 he ordinated the preparation of a major policy study for the Brazilian science and technology sector. The outcomes of this work were published in three volumes by the Getúlio Vargas Foundation in Brazil, in English and Portuguese.    In 2006-7 he coordinated the project with results published as  University and Development in Latin America: Successful Experiences of Research Centers, in Argentina, Brazil, Chile and Mexico.

Education policies.

In the 1980s he worked at the Center for Contemporary History of the Getúlio Vargas Foundation in Brazil, doing research on the establishment of Brazil’s education institutions in the 1930s, published as Tempos de Capanema  In 1989-94 he participated in a comparative study on higher education policies in Latin America, and published as Latin America: Universities in Transition  in 1996.  In 2001 he organized a Delphi survey on the future of education in Latin America, at the request of the UNESCO Office for Education in Latin America (OREALC), Santiago, Chile.  In 2005, with Colin Brock, he co-edited the book on The Challenges of Education in Brazil   published in English and Portuguese. In 2009 he co-edited a volume on Education Policies and Social Cohesion in Latin America”, and current projects include an edited book on higher education in the BRICS countries and another on education in the South American countries.  Two other recent papers dealt with issues of secondary and vocational education in Brazil.

Collected texts of Simon Schwartzman
Collected texts of Simon Schwartzman is a digital collection of Schwartzman's books at the Internet Archive. This collection contains over 900 books.

Select bibliography 
Where the book exists in multilingual editions, English information is given first.

 Schwartzman, S. "Falso Mineiro: "Memórias da Política, Ciência, Educação e Sociedade". Rio de Janeiro, Intrínseca / História Real, 2021.
 Schwartzman, S. and Edmar Bacha, José Murilo de Carvalho, Joaquim Falcão, Marcelo Trindade e Pedro Malan, "130 Anos: Em Busca da República. Rio de Janeiro,  Editora Intrínseca, 2019.
 Schwartzman, S. "Educação média profissional no Brasil: situação e caminhos". São Paulo: Fundação Santillana, 2016.
 Schwartzman, S. (editor), "Higher Education in Latin America and the challenges of the 21st century", Springer / Editora da Unicamp, 2020.
 Schwartzman, S. "A Educação Superior na América Latina e os Desafios do Século XXI", Editora Unicamp, 2015.
 Schwartzman, S. and Rómulo Pinheiro, and Pundy Pillay. "Higher Education in the BRICS Countries - Investigating the Pact between Higher Education and Society. Dordrecht: Springer, 2015.
 Schwartzman, S. "A Via Democrática -  Como o desenvolvimento econômico e social ocorre no Brasil". Rio de Janeiro, Campus - Elsevier.
 Schwartzman, S. and C.M. Castro. Reforma da Educação Superior: uma visão crítica. Brasília: Funadesp, 2005.
 Schwartzman, S. and Micheline Christophe. A sociedade do conhecimento e a educação tecnológica. Brasília: Senai - Departamento Nacional, 2005.
 Schwartzman, S. and C. Brock, editors. The Challenges of Education in Brazil. Oxford: Symposium Books, 2004. (Brazilian edition: Os desafios da educação no Brasil. Rio de Janeiro: Nova. Fronteira, 2005.)
 Schwartzman, S. Pobreza, exclusão social e modernidade: uma introdução ao mundo contempporâneo. São Paulo: Augurium Editora, 2004.
 Schwartzman, S. As Causas da Pobreza. Rio de Janeiro: Editora FGV, 2004.
 Schwartzman, S. and J.B.A.E. Oliveira.  A Escola Vista por Dentro. Belo Horizonte: Alfa Educativa Editora, 2002.
 Schwartzman, S. Trabalho Infantil no Brasil. Brasília: Organização Internacional do Trablho, 2001.
 Schwartzman, S.The Future of Education in Latin America and the Caribbean. Santiago: UNESCO -  - Santiago, 2001.
 Schwartzman, S. A Space for Science: The Development of the Scientific Community in Brazil. Pittsburgh: The Pennsylvania State University Press, 1991. (Brazilian 2nd edition: Um Espaço para a Ciência - a formação da comunidade científica no Brasil. Brasília: Ministério de Ciência e Tecnologia, Centro de Estudos Estratégicos, 2001. 1st edition published in 1979.)
 Schwartzman, S., H.M.B. Bomeny, and V.M.R. Costa. Tempos de Capanema. 2. ed. São Paulo e Rio de Janeiro: Editora Paz e Terra e Fundação Getúlio Vargas, 2000. (1st edition published in 1994.)
 Schwartzman, S. A Redescoberta da Cultura. São Paulo: Editora da Universidade de São Paulo, 1997.
 Schwartzman, S. America Latina universidades en transición. Washington, DC: Organização dos Estados Americanos, 1996.
 Schwartzman, S., E. Krieger, C.O. Bertero, and F. Galembeck, editors. Science and Technology in Brazil: a New Policy for a Global World. Rio de Janeiro: Editora da Fundação Getúlio Vargas, 1995. (Brazilian: Ciência e tecnologia no Brasil: uma nova política para um mundo global. Vol 2:. política industrial, mercado de trabalho e instituições de apoio. Rio de Janeiro: Editora da Fundação Getúlio Vargas, 1995.) 3 volumes.
 Schwartzman, S. Bases do Autoritarismo Brasileiro. Rio de Janeiro: Editora Campus, 1982.
 Schwartzman, S. Ciência, Universidade e Ideologia: A Política do Conhecimento. Rio de Janeiro: Zahar Editores, 1980.
 Schwartzman, S. São Paulo e o Estado Nacional. São Paulo: Difusão Européia do Livro, 1975.

References

External links 
Simon Schwartzman's personal page
/Academia Brasileira de Ciências
/   Academic Curriculum
 https://archive.org/details/simonschwartzman / collected texts of Simon Schwartzman

Brazilian sociologists
1939 births
Living people
Recipients of the Great Cross of the National Order of Scientific Merit (Brazil)
Brazilian Jews